Agera (East Indian:आगेरा) is a thanksgiving harvest festival celebrated by the Roman Catholic community of Mumbai primarily the East Indians. 

This traditional harvest festival is held in the beginning of October, when the grain would be ready for harvest, and lasted for five days. This Festival was celebrated by East Indian families all over Mumbai.
This festival would commence with the priest in every community, going down to the fields to bless the newly harvested crop and giving thanks to God, along with the farmers and villagers. 
After coming together in prayer, the community would celebrate with delicious food, singing and dance.

Etymology 
The word Agera is derived from Latin words Ager which means field or farm and Agricola which means Farmer

Date 
Agera falls on the first Sunday of October. It is normally called the Harvest festival where farmers cut the crops and offer the first fruits to God. It is normally seen throughout India where different communities celebrate this festive in their own ways.

Celebrations 
The East Indians were the people who were engaged in agricultural activities.

References

Harvest festivals in India
Thanksgiving